Sisa Namandje (born 1972) is a Namibian lawyer prominent for representing high profile namibian figures. He has represented all three Namibian presidents Sam Nujoma, Hifikepunye Pohamba and Hage Geingob.

Early life and education
Namandje was born on 15 December 1972 at Onyaanya in the Oshikoto Region of northern Namibia. He spent his primary school years in northern Namibia before the family moved to Zambian exile, where he attended school at SWAPO health education centre in Nyango. After Namibian independence he returned to Onyaanya and attended Uukule Senior Secondary School. He graduated 1994 at the age of 21.

In 1995 Namandje moved to Windhoek and worked at Windhoek Central Prison. A year later he quit and began his law studies at the University of Namibia. He graduated in 2000 with B.Juris and LLB degrees and joined the Namibian Defence Force where he rose to lieutenant colonel. In 2001 he served his articles as a candidate attorney at Nate Ndauendapo & Associates.

Legal career
Namandje rose to prominence between 2003 - 2005 during the trials of high profile public figures cases such as that of Jack Huang. In 2012, he was appointed Chief Electoral officer at the SWAPO Party electoral conference, a position he was re-appointed to in 2017. His law firm, Namandje Incorporated, has produced more than 50 Namibian lawyers since its inception.

In May 2020, he was involved in a legal battle with the Law Society of Namibia over his trust accounts.

Public image
Namandje first rose to prominence in the Namibia legal system in 2007 when he represented two Chinese nationals who were accused of smuggling ivory out of Namibia. Since then, he was the first Namibian to appear on Masters of Success on MTC Namibia which discusses the success of prominent African people. Additionally, he has represented politicians SWAPO Party Youth League secretary and president Paulus Kapia in his corruption trial. In 2019, he represented Namibian education minister Katrina Hanse-Himarwa in her trial after she was accused of using her office as governor of Hardap Region to award houses to her relatives.

In 2014, it was reported that three people in Outapi had been scammed by individuals who claimed to be, or to represent the name of, Sisa Namandje. In a statement issued by his legal firm, Namandje warned against individuals using his name for personal gain and that if found such individuals would be prosecuted.

Namandje has expressed the need for changes in the Namibian judicial system. Saying at a Masters of Success event in 2015 that if given a chance, he would represent land activist Job Amupanda as he believed there was a need to protect the interests of poor Namibians.

Personal life
Sisa is the first of 12 children of Simon and Ruusa Namandje. He is married to Lovisa Namandje with whom he has two children, Hambelela and Iyaloo. He lives in Windhoek.

References

Living people
1972 births
Namibian lawyers
People from Oshikoto Region
University of Namibia alumni
21st-century Namibian lawyers